Juan Luis Pérez Iborra (born 25 March 1959), simply known as Juan Luis Iborra, is a Spanish screenwriter and director.

Biography 
Juan Luis Pérez Iborra was born in L'Alfàs del Pi on 25 March 1959. He moved to Madrid, where he started studying drama in 1979.

After making his acting debut on stage in 1982, he developed instead a career as a screenwriter (both in film and television), including Televisión Española's show .

In 1995, he won the Goya Award for Best Original Screenplay for All Men Are the Same. One year later, he earned a nomination for Best Original Screenplay for Mouth to Mouth.

They were followed by Valentín, and Crazy. He also worked as director of the popular series Aquí no hay quien viva and La que se avecina.

References 

1959 births
People from Marina Baixa
Spanish screenwriters
Spanish film directors
Spanish television directors
Living people